Matt Borlenghi  is an American actor, best known for his roles as Brian Bodine on All My Children from 1991 to 1993 and 1996, as Russ on The Jeff Foxworthy Show, as Rich Casey on Police Academy: The Series and as Lyle on Cobra Kai.

Career 

Borlenghi came to national attention playing Brian Bodine on All My Children in the early 1990s. His character was the main romantic interest of Hayley Vaughan, played by Kelly Ripa, until he quit the show in 1993 in favor of doing comedy TV. However, later in 1996, he did make a brief return to stir things up between Hayley and new boyfriend Mateo (Mark Consuelos).

Borlenghi also played Ziggy Deadmarsh on CBS soap opera The Bold and the Beautiful in 2002, and Mayor Anthony Marino on NBC Days of Our Lives.

Borlenghi spent several years starring on various sitcoms, such as The Jeff Foxworthy Show, in which he portrayed Jeff Foxworthy's assistant Russ Francis; Pig Sty on UPN; Party Girl on FOX; and Police Academy: The Series. He also guest-starred on Melissa and Joey and other shows. He directed a short film, Jack, which won him awards on the film festival circuit. He played the title role in the adaptation independent film Jack Rio, which he also co-wrote and produced with director Gregori J. Martin ("The Bay"), and more recently starred in "Branded" and "Lethal Admirer".

Borlenghi also creates, develops, and produces reality TV shows, such as Postmortem in Vegas for LMN / A&E Networks and just completed a one-hour law enforcement drama pilot script revolving around a federal agency, "ATF".

Borlenghi moved to Atlanta, Georgia to become a part of the filming community there and to teach acting to kids though adults and had recurring roles on two shows that film there, the Netflix series Cobra Kai and Champaign ILL. In addition, he starred as Bobby DeBarge's real-life manager Bernd Lichter in The Bobby DeBarge Story, a huge hit on TV One network. Borlenghi also plays a role in the new video game MAFIA: Definitive Edition, as Sergio Morello.

Filmography

Television

Film

Awards and nominations

References

External links 

Living people
American male film actors
American male soap opera actors
American male television actors
Year of birth missing (living people)